Christopher David Noth  (born November 13, 1954) is an American actor. He is known for his television roles as NYPD Detective Mike Logan on Law & Order (1990–95), Big on Sex and the City (1998–2004), and Peter Florrick on The Good Wife (2009–16).

Noth reprised his role of Mike Logan on Law & Order: Criminal Intent (2005–08), and reprised his role of Big in the films Sex and the City (2008) and Sex and the City 2 (2010). He was nominated for the Golden Globe Award for Best Supporting Actor on Television for Sex and the City in 1999 and for The Good Wife in 2010.

Noth starred in the first two seasons of the 2021 revival of The Equalizer, on CBS, and appeared in And Just Like That..., the revival of Sex and the City.

Early life
Noth was born November 13, 1954, in Madison, Wisconsin, the youngest of three boys, to news reporter Jeanne Parr (1924–2016). Parr was one of the first female correspondents for CBS News, and host of her own CBS talk show The Jeanne Parr Show. His father was Charles James Noth (1922–1966), a marketing-company vice president and insurance agent who was a naval aviator in World War II and served as Ensign on the  during the Korean War. Charles came from a wealthy family in Chicago, and his mother had Irish ancestry that traces back to Knockbride in County Cavan.

Noth's family settled in Stamford, Connecticut, when he was five. Noth grew up in Connecticut while his parents worked in New York City. His parents separated when he was 9 or 10, and his father died in a car accident in 1966 when he was 11. According to Noth, "losing my father left a crater in my life" and he found father figures in many teachers and certain friends of his mother's. While Parr was working as a CBS news reporter in New York during the 1960s, Noth often got into trouble. He was into vandalism and was smoking marijuana and driving at a very young age. During Parr's brief second marriage, the family moved to southern California in 1969, returning to New York in the early 1970s. Noth said that he started taking LSD with friends at age 15, once walking into someone else's house in Newport Beach while high and jumping naked off their pier into the water.

After Noth took a neighbor's car for a joyride and it rolled into another neighbor's house, his mother sent him to an all-boys boarding school (Storm King School) where he spent his freshman year (1968-1969) . Noth persuaded his mother to let him leave Storm King School to attend an experimental coed school called The Barlow School in Dutchess County, New York, instead. Poet-dissenter Peter Kane Dufault taught American history at the school. Noth said Dufault was the best teacher he ever had, "He opened up a way of life to me, a life of the imagination; he showed us ... that life can be developed and explored through poetry". For Noth, this school with young artist teachers "for many of us, not relating to our parents, it became our real home", and although "the academics were a little shaky", this art school, with no grades, completely changed his life to focus on the arts. By 1973, he was "totally into being a hippie" with long hair. After graduation, he moved to Brooklyn with his girlfriend when he was eighteen, and worked at a school for the mentally disabled.

Noth attended Marlboro College in Vermont, originally intending to be a writer or poet. He received a classically oriented education and studied English literature and religion. Although the college did not have a theatre department, he discovered acting after joining the repertory theatre company to get out of Latin class. He first appeared on stage in the play She Stoops To Conquer, where he enjoyed the audience's unexpected laughter. After acting in a production of The Zoo Story by Edward Albee, his goals were set on becoming a stage actor. After graduation, he was eager to perform in The New York Repertory Theatre but found that there was not much work for young actors in New York after arriving in late 1978. The first and only job he could get was as a daytime bartender at the Only Child Restaurant, not realizing there was a brothel above the basement pub. He was accepted into the Neighborhood Playhouse School of the Theatre to study with acting teacher Sanford Meisner. He stayed in maid's rooms for little or no money in exchange for cleaning the house on a weekly basis. The school did not allow students to work in the theatre, and Noth was expelled after a photo appeared of him in The New York Times acting in a 1979 Manhattan Theatre Club play about an IRA bombing victim. He also studied script analysis with Stella Adler.

Career

Theatre
Noth "did off-off Broadway and was a bad waiter in a dozen different restaurants for five years." He was fired from a number of restaurants, once for forgetting to return Governor Hugh Carey's credit card with the bill, and settled into cater-waitering bar mitzvahs and weddings. Noth got his Actors' Equity membership while at the Circle Rep Lab. In Circle Repertory Company's 1980 production of Innocent Thoughts, Harmless Intentions he played soldier James "Duke" Wade in an Alaskan army outpost in 1951–52, part of what the CS Monitor called a "convincing squad of Actors' Equity enlisted men" in a play that was "impressively acted". He auditioned for Juilliard and Yale University and was accepted by both. He chose the shorter three-year degree at Yale School of Drama, where he got a scholarship.

Noth acted in 25 or more plays while studying at Yale School of Drama, attending classes during the day and acting in plays at night. Noth's first-year acting project at Yale was the Maxim Gorky play The Lower Depths in 1982–1983. In 1984, Frank Rich of The New York Times wrote that of the supporting cast, only Noth's and Ray Aranha's performances "leaves firm impressions" in the world premiere of the Wole Soyinka political satire A Play of Giants at Yale Repertory Theatre, where Noth played a sculptor creating a portrait of African dictators gathered at a U.N. Embassy. In 1985, Noth acted in Keith Reddin's Rum and Coke at Yale Repertory Theatre, a play about the orchestration of the Bay of Pigs Invasion. By Noth's third year, he signed with an agent who saw him in a YSD production of Brendan Behan's The Hostage. Noth was also in Anton Chekhov's Three Sisters and William Shakespeare's Pericles, Prince of Tyre at YSD.

After graduating with an MFA in 1985, Noth told his agent he would not do television and went on the theater circuit. His preference to work in theater informed his decision to live in New York instead of Los Angeles. However, roles were slow to come and he decided he could do television to survive. In 1986, while working on the TV series Hill Street Blues in L.A., Noth heard that Zoe Caldwell would be directing Hamlet at the American Shakespeare Festival at Stratford, Connecticut and successfully auditioned for the title role. The play was performed for student groups in the spring season that year and Noth felt the enthusiastic response of students from the inner cities to Hamlet's soliloquies made it one of his greatest experiences. In the 1988/89 season of Milwaukee Repertory Theater, he played a murderous bandit in the experimental Chilean play The Torch. In April 1989, Noth played "bohemian--out of place, angry with the world" Frank Shabata in Darrah Cloud's adaption of the Willa Cather novel O Pioneers! in the Other Season at Seattle Repertory Theatre, co-produced by Women's Project. He also appeared in George Bernard Shaw play Arms and the Man at the Roundabout Theatre in 1989 as Sergius Saranoff. The New York Times wrote that Noth's acting "captures the strutting buffoon in the character" but lost "the more pitiable side", while The Christian Science Monitor wrote if "Noth's swaggering Sergius were any more Sergius-like, he would burst out of his uniform". Noth acted in plays for La MaMa Experimental Theatre Club and L.A.'s Mark Taper Forum.

In 1997, Noth played an opera composer in the Romulus Linney play Patronage at Ensemble Studio Theatre's 20th Annual Festival of New One-Act Plays. The New York Times wrote "the actors are so good that they may have put more flesh on the characters than even Mr. Linney intended" and that Noth and co-star Dana Reeve were "amusingly synchronized as they purred in unison...to the strains of Schubert". Linney became friends with Noth when they worked together on Patronage and Noth encouraged him to write a play about Delmore Schwartz as Noth "is a poet himself and loves the poetry of Delmore Schwartz", according to Linney. Noth performed in the 2002 staged reading of Linney's play Klonsky and Schwartz at the Eugene O'Neill Theater Center's annual Playwrights Conference and helped workshop the play at the 2003 Last Frontier Theatre Conference. In 1998, while working on Sex and the City before its TV debut, Noth did his first radio play as fortune-hunter Morris Townsend in the Voice of America production of The Heiress, an adaptation of the Henry James novel Washington Square, opposite Amy Irving in the title role.

In 2000, Noth made his Broadway debut in a revival of Gore Vidal's 1960  play The Best Man at Virginia Theatre as the conniving Senator Joseph Cantwell. Variety wrote that Noth "plays the role capably but without the seething edge required" and The New York Times wrote Noth "never gives Cantwell the all-consuming, compulsive drive" and the "variations on Nixonian tics..have the imposed feeling of a director's suggestions." A few months later The New York Times wrote the cast's performances improved significantly with Noth improving the most, having "achieved a fine balance between editorial cartoon and neurotic case study as the Nixonian man who would be president." The revival went on to win a Drama Desk Award and Outer Critics Circle Award for outstanding revival of a play and was nominated for Tony Award for Best Revival of a Play. In the 2002 premiere of Christopher Shinn's play What Didn't Happen at Playwrights Horizons, Noth's portrayal of Peter was described as "an enjoyably robust portrait" by The New York Times and "an endearing, minor-key star turn" by Variety.

Noth played Colonel Thayer in a 2005 staged reading of a revival of another Gore Vidal play, the 1961 drama On the March to the Sea, presented by Theater Previews at Duke at Duke University. According to reviews of his portrayal, "Noth effectively conveys a jaded, command soldier tired of war, sometimes ruthless, yet often philosophical and sympathetic", a contradictory character "beautifully evoked" as "fully and pitiably human" and comparable to Stanley Kowalski in his "deliberate malice"; although Noth "followed the script" when it occasionally turned melodramatic. Noth received glowing reviews as petty criminal "Teach" in David Mamet's play American Buffalo at the 2005 Berkshire Theatre Festival. In 2008, Noth portrayed Paul Zara in Beau Willimon's Off-Broadway debut  play Farragut North staged by the Atlantic Theatre Company. The play had its world premiere in the week after the 2008 United States presidential election and The New York Times critic Ben Brantley wrote that he "enjoyed Mr. Noth’s weary, bluff, stiff-jointed Paul". In 2009, Noth reprised the role in the play's West coast debut at the Geffen Playhouse opposite Chris Pine. The director of the film Sex and the City 2 demanded Noth lose the weight he gained for his role in the play before filming of the movie began.

In 2011, Noth starred in a Broadway revival of the 1972 play That Championship Season, playing Phil Romano. In 2019 Noth appeared with Isabelle Huppert in an Off-Broadway production of Florian Zeller's The Mother.

Film and television
Noth played small parts in films, including Smithereens (1982) and Baby Boom (1987) before his first starring role in the low-budget 1988 film Peluru dan Wanita (Bullets & Women) in Indonesia. Noth joined the cast of Hill Street Blues in the sixth season in 1986, where he was billed as "Christopher Noth." He also appeared in Another World.

Noth filmed a pilot for the legal/police drama series Law & Order in 1988, playing NYPD homicide detective Mike Logan. In 1990, NBC began airing Law & Order. Noth was fired from the show in 1995, due largely to creative friction with series creator Dick Wolf. He reprised the role of Mike Logan in 1998 for the Law & Order TV movie, Exiled: A Law & Order Movie.

In 1995, Noth had a supporting role in a CBS miniseries adaptation of the Sidney Sheldon novel Nothing Lasts Forever where he and Vanessa Williams portrayed lovers who are medical residents in a San Francisco hospital. Noth appeared in a 1997 episode of the TV series Touched by an Angel. In the 1997 television mini-series Rough Riders on TNT he portrayed Craig Wadsworth, a member of the 1st United States Volunteer Cavalry.

From 1998 to 2004, Noth took the role of Carrie Bradshaw's on-again, off-again boyfriend "Big" on HBO's Sex and the City. The role established Noth as a romantic comedian and he reprised it for the 2008 Sex and the City film and its 2010 sequel. He had a small role as Helen Hunt's husband in the film Cast Away (2000) starring Tom Hanks. In 2001, he played an FBI agent on a three-episode arc of Crossing Jordan.

From 2005 to 2008, Noth returned to the role of Mike Logan on Law & Order: Criminal Intent,  joining the show in its fifth season following a guest appearance on a fourth season episode. On this spin-off of the original Law & Order, Noth's detective team alternated episodes with Vincent D'Onofrio and Kathryn Erbe's characters. In the 2005 rom-com film, The Perfect Man, Noth's portrayal of the romance expert from whom Hilary Duff's lead character models a secret admirer for her mother was described as "appealing in a thinly written role" by Variety.

In the CBS series The Good Wife (2009–2016), Noth portrayed Peter Florrick, disgraced and resurrected politician husband of the title character portrayed by Julianna Margulies. Noth was not a full-time regular on the series, leaving him time to do plays and indie films. In 2009, Noth guest-starred as an authoritarian military man in the film My One and Only starring Renée Zellweger as woman searching for a spouse.

In 2012, Noth narrated I Didn’t Do It a 6-part crime documentary series about wrongful convictions produced by Toronto's Lively Media for Discovery Canada and Investigation Discovery and portrayed tycoon J. P. Morgan, who helped finance the Titanic, in the Encore channel miniseries Titanic: Blood and Steel. In 2013, he portrayed Anthony Romano, a financier of Deep Throat, in the movie Lovelace.  In 2014, Noth played the son-in-law of an ageing man, Fred, portrayed by Christopher Plummer in the film Elsa & Fred. In the 2015 movie After the Ball, Noth played a head of a Montreal fashion company.

In 2016, Noth joined the third season of the FX/Fox 21 Television Studios produced series Tyrant in the regular role of U.S. General William Cogswell who offers military support to the interim president of a fictional Middle Eastern country that is trying to start a social democracy. A review of Noth's first Tyrant episode likened General Cogswell to his Peter Florrick character in The Good Wife. In an interview before the episode aired, Noth said he was "pretty much done with parts that resemble Mr. Big or Peter Florrick", he was turning to darker roles after years of playing (mostly) good guys on his three hit TV shows. Noth portrayed a sleazy lawyer in the 2016 film White Girl. In the 2016 film Chronically Metropolitan Noth's portrayal of a philandering professor/novelist was praised by The Hollywood Reporter for "infusing his familiar-feeling character with intriguing nuances" and as "very good" by the Los Angeles Times.<ref name="hollywoodreporter-20170803">{{cite magazine |last1=Scheck |first1=Frank |title=Chronically Metropolitan': Film Review |url=https://www.hollywoodreporter.com/review/chronically-metropolitan-1026451 |magazine=The Hollywood Reporter |date=August 3, 2017}}</ref>

In 2017, Noth played FBI agent Don Ackerman on the Discovery Channel's series Manhunt: Unabomber, about the hunt for the serial killer Ted Kaczynski and was the narrator for the "Sharks and the City: New York" episode of Discovery channel's Shark Week. Noth also portrayed FBI agent Frank Novak in Gone, a 12-episode procedural drama produced by NBC Universal. The New York Post wrote in its review of the show that "Noth, who's always reliable, is fine here, but doesn’t have much to do other than set up each storyline and then bark lots of orders." In 2018, Noth played the character Jack Robertson in the Doctor Who episode "Arachnids in the UK" and returned to the show in 2021 New Year's Day special, "Revolution of the Daleks".

In 2021, Noth played the lead role of William Bishop in CBS reboot crime drama series The Equalizer, which was written by Andrew W. Marlowe and Terri Edda Miller. The same year, Noth reprised his role as Mr. Big in And Just Like That..., the Sex and the City continuation, where he was killed off, leading to a subsequent Peloton advertisement in the role. By the end of the year, he was fired and the ad was pulled due to allegations of sexual assault.

Personal life
Noth is co-owner of The Cutting Room, a New York lounge and music venue that opened in late 1999, with Steve Walter. He also co-owned the New York nightclub The Plumm with Noel Ashman and other investors including David Wells and Damon Dash. Noth became majority-stake owner of Ambhar Tequila in 2018.

Noth had a relationship with model Beverly Johnson from 1990 to 1995. Johnson filed a restraining order against Noth, accusing him of physical, verbal, and racial abuse.

He began a relationship with Tara Lynn Wilson, a Canadian model, actress, and former beauty queen after meeting her in 2001 or 2002. Their son Orion was born in January 2008. The couple became co-owners of the tea house Once Upon a Tea Cup in Windsor, Ontario, and another location in London, Ontario. They were married on April 6, 2012. Noth announced the birth of their second son Keats in February 2020.

Noth moved with his family to the Los Angeles suburb of Sherman Oaks. He owns an apartment in Greenwich Village that he had since 1994 and another in a Lenox Hill co-op since 2017. The family has a summer house in the Berkshires on the edge of Great Barrington, Massachusetts.

Sexual misconduct allegations
On December 16, 2021, Noth was accused of sexual assault by two women, who used the names Lily and Zoe, with one woman alleging that Noth cheated on his wife when he assaulted her. Both women, who do not know each other and contacted The Hollywood Reporter months apart, were much younger than Noth at the time of the alleged incident. The incidents allegedly occurred in Los Angeles in 2004, and in New York in 2015. He denied the allegations, claiming the incidents were consensual and that he did not cross the line of "no means no".

The next day, actress and screenwriter Zoe Lister-Jones alleged that Noth was "consistently sexually inappropriate" when she worked with him on a 2005 episode of Law & Order: Criminal Intent, was "a sexual predator", and was drunk while filming his scenes. Subsequently, he was dropped by A3 Artists Agency.

On December 18, another woman accused Noth of sexual assault, in New York in 2010, saying that when she was eighteen he forcibly kissed her and removed her tights in an effort to digitally penetrate her. Noth's publicist denied the incident happened and said Noth did not know the woman.

On December 23, 2021, singer-songwriter Lisa Gentile accused Noth of sexually assaulting her in New York in 2002. She said he forcibly kissed her and grabbed and squeezed her breasts.

In the wake of the allegations, a $12-million deal for Entertainment Arts Research Inc. to buy Noth's tequila brand Ambhar was canceled, a Peloton commercial starring Noth and Ryan Reynolds was pulled from the air, and he was dismissed part way through the second season from his role as William Bishop, who was killed off-screen on The Equalizer. A second appearance as Big in the season finale of And Just Like That...'' was also scrapped.

Filmography

Film

Television

Awards and nominations

Citations

General and cited references

External links

 
 

1954 births
20th-century American male actors
21st-century American male actors
Chris Noth sexual misconduct allegations
Actors from Madison, Wisconsin
American male film actors
American male stage actors
American male television actors
American people of Canadian descent
American people of German descent
American people of Irish descent
Living people
Male actors from New York City
Male actors from Wisconsin
Marlboro College alumni
Nightclub owners
Theatre World Award winners
Yale School of Drama alumni
Yale University alumni